Diatraea instructella is a moth in the family Crambidae. It was described by Harrison Gray Dyar Jr. in 1911. It is found in Mexico.

References

Chiloini
Moths described in 1911